Ponniah is a Tamil surname. From Tamil pon- ‘gold’ + -aiah an honorific suffix meaning ‘father’ (Sanskrit ārya).

Notable people with the surname include:
Joseph Ponniah (born 1952), Sri Lanka Roman Catholic bishop
Mano Ponniah (born 1943), Sri Lankan architect, engineer, and cricketer
Rennis Ponniah, Singaporean Anglican bishop

References

Tamil masculine given names